Moravian Slovakia (older Moravské Slovensko) or Slovácko is a cultural region in the southeastern part of the Czech Republic, Moravia on the border with Slovakia and Austria, known for its characteristic folklore, music, wine, costumes and traditions. The area forms part of both the Zlín and South Moravian administrative regions.

Its main centre is the town of Uherské Hradiště which is located on the Morava River. Other important towns include Uherský Brod, Břeclav, Hodonín, Strážnice and Kyjov. In the 9th century the region of Moravian Slovakia was the centre of the Great Moravian empire.

Subregions
Moravian Slovakia is divided into six subregions: Dolňácko, Horňácko, Podluží, Moravské Kopanice, Hanácké Slovácko and Luhačovické zálesí.

Economy  
Moravian Slovakia is noted for its viticulture.

Language
Natives of this region speak the Eastern Moravian dialects of the Czech language, which are transitional dialects between Czech and Slovak. Due to these cultural and linguistic links to Slovakia, many ethnographers until the 20th century used to consider Moravian Slovaks as a people which politically belonged to Moravia and the Bohemian Crown but ethnographically and culturally to the Slovak ethnic group. Historically, there were also significant numbers of German speakers who also influenced local speech.

Sport
Since 2004, the football club from Uherské Hradiště is named 1. FC Slovácko and is rare example of a Czech club holding the name of its home region and not of its home city or town.

Notable people
Tomáš Garrigue Masaryk, philosopher, president of Czechoslovakia
Jan Černý, president of Moravia, PM of Czechoslovakia
John Amos Comenius, philosopher, founder of modern education
František Peřina, general, RAF ace
Francis I, Prince of Liechtenstein, ruling monarch
John II, Prince of Liechtenstein, third-longest ruling monarch of Europe
Václav Nedomanský, Hall of Fame ice hockey player

References

Further reading
 
 Bogatyrev, Petr, Richard G. Crum (1973).The functions of folk costume in Moravian Slovakia. American Anthropologist,Volume 75, Issue 6, page 1896.
 Bogatyrev, Petr, (1971).The functions of folk costume in Moravian Slovakia. Mouton.

External links 

Official tourist portal
The Museum of Moravian Slovakia 
Moravian Slovakia at the South Moravian Region website

 
Moravia
Czech folklore